Sir Douglas William Gretton Wass   (15 April 1923 – 4 January 2017) was a British civil servant who served as Permanent Secretary to HM Treasury from 1974 to 1983.

He was educated at Nottingham High School and St John's College, Cambridge.

Wass was Permanent Secretary to HM Treasury from 1974 to 1983 and served as joint head of the civil service following the retirement of Sir Ian Bancroft in 1981 until his own retirement.

He was appointed a Companion of the Order of the Bath (CB) in 1971, elevated to Knight Commander (KCB) in 1975 and further elevated to Knight Grand Cross (GCB) in 1980. In 1985, he was awarded an Honorary Degree (Doctor of Letters) by the University of Bath.

In 1983, Sir Douglas presented the annual BBC Reith Lectures. In a series of six lectures titled Government and the Governed, he examined the role and responsibilities of government.

Wass died on 4 January 2017 at the age of 93.

References

External links 
 BBC Radio 4: The Reith Lectures 1983 - Government and the Governed
 Podcast: Reith Lectures Archive 1976 - 2010
 5 Part Radio Interview with Sir Douglas Wass on BBC, ''Douglas Wass: Government and the Governed: 1983 

1923 births
2017 deaths
Alumni of St John's College, Cambridge
Knights Grand Cross of the Order of the Bath
People educated at Nottingham High School
Permanent Secretaries of HM Treasury